The United Nations Emergency Force (UNEF) was a military and peacekeeping operation established by the United Nations General Assembly to secure an end to the Suez Crisis of 1956 through the establishment of international peacekeepers on the border between Egypt and Israel. Approved by resolution 1001 (ES-I) of 7 November 1956, UNEF was developed in large measure as a result of efforts by UN Secretary-General Dag Hammarskjöld and a proposal from Canadian Minister of External Affairs Lester B. Pearson, who would later win the Nobel Peace Prize for it. The General Assembly had approved a plan submitted by the Secretary-General which envisaged the deployment of UNEF on both sides of the armistice line; Egypt accepted receiving the UN forces, but Israel refused it. In May 1967, Egypt asked that UNEF leave Egypt; as the troops started to evacuate over the next days, Israel invaded Egypt on 6 June 1967, initiating the Six-Day War and causing the death of one Brazilian Sergeant and 14 Indian peacekeepers – 17 other members of UNEF were also injured. The last member of UNEF left Egypt on 17 June.

The UN General Assembly later established a Second United Nations Emergency Force in 1973 in response to the Yom Kippur War.

History

The first UN military force of its kind, UNEF's mission was to:

... enter Egyptian territory with the consent of the Egyptian Government, in order to help maintain quiet during and after the withdrawal of non-Egyptian forces and to secure compliance with the other terms established in the resolution ... to cover an area extending roughly from the Suez Canal to the Armistice Demarcation Lines established in the Armistice Agreement between Egypt and Israel.

UNEF was formed under the authority of the General Assembly and was subject to the national sovereignty clause, Article 2, Paragraph 7, of the U.N. Charter. An agreement between the Egyptian government and the Secretary-General, The Good Faith Accords, or Good Faith Aide-Memoire, placed the UNEF force in Egypt with the consent of the Egyptian government.

Since the operative UN resolutions were not passed under Chapter VII of the United Nations Charter, the planned deployment of a military forces had to be approved by Egypt and Israel. Israel's Prime Minister refused to restore the 1949 armistice lines and stated that under no circumstances would Israel agree to the stationing of UN forces on its territory or in any area it occupied. After multilateral negotiations with Egypt, eleven countries offered to contribute to a force on the Egyptian side of the armistice line: Brazil, Canada, Colombia, Denmark, Finland, India, Indonesia, Norway, Sweden, and Yugoslavia. Support was also provided by United States, Italy, and Switzerland. The first forces arrived in Cairo on 15 November, and UNEF was at its full force of 6,000 by February 1957. The force was fully deployed in designated areas around the canal, in the Sinai and Gaza when Israel withdrew its last forces from Rafah on 8 March 1957. The UN Secretary-General sought to station UNEF forces on the Israeli side of the 1949 armistice lines, but this was rejected by Israel.

The mission was directed to be accomplished in four phases:
 In November and December 1956, the force facilitated the orderly transition in the Suez Canal area when British and French forces left.
 From December 1956 to March 1957, the force facilitated the separation of Israeli and Egyptian forces and the Israeli evacuation from all areas captured during the war, except Gaza and Sharm-el-Sheik.
 In March 1957, the force facilitated the departure of Israeli forces from Gaza and Sharm-el-Sheik.
 Deployment along the borders for purposes of observation. This phase ended in May 1967.

Due to financial constraints and changing needs, the force shrank through the years to 3,378 by May 1967.

On 16 May 1967, the Egyptian government ordered all United Nations forces – at the time, composed mostly of military contingents from Brazil, Canada, and India, with a smaller Swedish contingent – out of Sinai. Secretary-General U Thant tried to redeploy UNEF to areas on the Israeli side of the border, in order to maintain a buffer, but this was rejected by Israel.

By 31 May, the Canadian contingent had already been completely evacuated by air, with the Brazilian, Indian and Swedish contingents still preparing for evacuation, when Israel invaded Egypt on 5 June 1967, starting the Six-Day War. In different episodes, Israeli forces attacked a UNEF convoy, camps in which UNEF personnel were concentrated and the UNEF headquarters in Gaza. In these episodes, one Brazilian peacekeeper and 14 Indian officials were killed by Israeli forces, with an additional seventeen wounded in both contingents.

The last United Nations peacekeeper left the region on 17 June.

Casualties 
The Brazilian peacekeeper killed by Israeli forces was Sergeant Adalberto Ilha de Macedo. The Indian members of UNEF killed in the Israeli attacks were: Captain Vijay Sachar, Subahdar Ajit Singh, Sepoy Sohan Singh, Sepoy Joginder Singh, Sepoy Pritam Singh, Sepoy Sadhu Singh, Sepoy Mohinder Singh, Bandsman Gopal Singh, Sepoy Mukhtiar Singh, L/Naik Sulakhan Singh, Sepoy Jit Singh, Sepoy G. K. Kutty, Nce Sona Baitha, and Sepoy Zora Singh.

Force Commanders 

Stationed in Gaza City.
Nov. 1956 – Dec. 1959 Lieutenant-General E. L. M. Burns (Canada)
Dec. 1959 – Jan. 1964 Lieutenant-General P. S. Gyani (India)
Jan. 1964 – Aug. 1964 Major-General Carlos F. Paiva Chaves (Brazil)
Aug. 1964 – Jan. 1965 Colonel Lazar Mušicki (Yugoslavia) (Acting)
Jan. 1965 – Jan. 1966 Major-General Syseno Sarmento (Brazil)
Jan. 1966 – June 1967 Major-General Indar Jit Rikhye (India)

Contributing countries
Contributors of military personnel were: Brazil, Canada, Colombia, Denmark, Finland, India, Indonesia, Norway, Sweden, and Yugoslavia.

See also 
 Multinational Force and Observers, a somewhat similar, but smaller force instituted to ensure enforcement of the Egyptian–Israeli Peace Treaty
 Second United Nations Emergency Force
 United Nations Security Council Resolution 340
 United Nations Truce Supervision Organization
 Yom Kippur War

Notes

References

Further reading

External links 
Records of the United Nations Emergency Force I (UNEF I) (1956-1967) at the United Nations Archives
 UN DPKO
 UN document centre
 UN SC Resolutions

Military units and formations established in 1956
Arab–Israeli conflict
20th century in Egypt
Suez Crisis
Egypt
Egypt
Sinai Peninsula
Egypt and the United Nations